Lipper is the surname of:

 David Lipper (born 1974), Canadian actor, director, producer and writer
 Kenneth Lipper, American politician, civil servant, business executive, novelist and documentary producer
 Michael Lipper (1932–1987), Irish politician
 Susan Lipper (born 1953), American photographer